Metrotronics is a 2008 EP from the South Korean group Clazziquai. Clazziquai teamed up with Pentavision for their Metro Project that soon packaged the minor release of DJ MAX series after DJ MAX Portable 2 named as DJ MAX Portable Clazziquai Edition for PlayStation Portable.

7 songs from Metrotronics (Electronics, Flea, Color, Night Stage, Creator, Freedom, Come to me) are included for gameplay in DJ MAX Portable Clazziquai Edition. In addition, Flea is the opening song to the game, Creator is the button mode selection music, Night Stage is the music for the song results screen, and Electronics is the Stage Clear results screen music and the Network mode select music.

CD
 Electronics
 Flea
 Beat in love
 Color
 Night stage
 Creator
 Beautiful stranger (sliced cheese remix)
 Beat in love (Yasutaka Nakata [capsule] remix)

DVD
 Electronics
 Flea
 Beat in love
 Color
 Night stage
 Creator
 Come to me
 Freedom
 Flea + Beat in love (M/V Making with Directors Commentary)
 DJMAX promotion

External links
 Official Clazziquai website
 Official DJ MAX Portable Clazziquai Edition website

2008 EPs
EPs by South Korean artists